Frank Nesser (June 3, 1889 – January 1, 1953) was a professional football player in the "Ohio League" and the early National Football League. During his career he played mainly for the Columbus Panhandles, however he did also play for a little for the Akron Indians, whenever he was recruited by Indians manager, Peggy Parratt.

Frank was a member of the Nesser Brothers, a group consisting of seven brothers who made-up the most famous football family in the United States from 1907 until the mid-1920s.

Nesser frequently engaged in kicking contests with the legendary Jim Thorpe; he once was credited with a 63-yard field goal and his punts were recalled as averaging 70 yards in the air. Frank was also a sensational runner, but his greatest value for the Panhandles was as a passer. He led the Panhandles in scoring during most of his professional seasons.

Nesser was also a minor league baseball player in the Ohio State League from 1910–1914. He later played in the North Carolina State League in 1915 and 1916. After abandoning baseball for a few years he restarted his career in the Illinois–Indiana–Iowa League in 1920 and played one final season, in 1921, in the Michigan–Ontario League. He left baseball after 9 seasons in which he posted a .325 batting average.

References

External links
Frank Nesser stats at Baseball-Reference

1889 births
1953 deaths
Players of American football from Ohio
Akron Indians (Ohio League) players
Chillicothe Babes players
Columbus Panhandles players
Columbus Indians players
Columbus Panhandles (Ohio League) players
Greensboro Patriots players
Lima Cigarmakers players
Peoria Tractors players
Saginaw Aces players
Winston-Salem Twins players
People from Dennison, Ohio
Baseball players from Ohio
Nesser family (American football)